John Sayer may refer to:
John Sayer (fur trader)
John William Sayer, VC recipient
John Sayer (MP)
John Sayer (cricketer) (1920–2013), cricketer and officer in the Fleet Air Arm and the Royal Navy

See also
John L Sayers, Australian recording engineer